Guttormsson is a Nordic surname that may refer to:

Bård Guttormsson (c. 1150–1194), medieval Norwegian nobleman
 Jón Guttormsson Skráveifa (died 1361), governor of Iceland from 1357 to 1360
 Andras Guttormsson (c. 1490–1544), First Minister of the Faroe Islands (1531–1544)
 Ísak Guttormsson, First Minister of the Faroe Islands 1583–1588
 Hjörleifur Guttormsson (born 1935), Icelandic politician